The 1913 Copa de Competencia La Nación Final was the final that decided the winner of the 1st. edition of Copa de Competencia La Nación, an Argentine domestic cup organised by dissident body Federación Argentina de Football. The match was contested by Argentino de Quilmes and Rosario Central. 

The final was held in Gimnasia y Esgrima Stadium in Palermo, Buenos Aires, on October 26, 1913. Rosario Central beat Argentino 3–2, winning their first national title ever.

Qualified teams

Overview 

This edition was contested by all the teams of the 1913 Primera División season (excepting Tigre) plus Second Division teams. The competition was named after newspaper La Nación, which had donated the trophy.

The competition was played under a single-elimination format, with two Rosario representatives entering directly to semifinals. In that stage, Rosario Central beat Porteño 2–1 at Independiente stadium, earning its right to play the final. On the other hand, Argentino started in round of 16, beating Juventud del Tigre 3–1, Gimnasia y Esgrima BA 2–0, Estudiantes de La Plata 1–0 and Tiro Federal 4–0 in the semifinal.

Match details 

|

|}

References

N
1913 in Argentine football
Football in Buenos Aires